The Clone Republic is the first book in the Clone series of novels, set in 2508 AD. It is followed by Rogue Clone, The Clone Alliance, The Clone Elite, The Clone Betrayal, The Clone Empire, The Clone Redemption, The Clone Sedition, The Clone Assassin, and The Clone Apocalypse.

Plot 
In a galactic military largely consisting of clones raised to be unquestioning soldiers, Wayson Harris initially has difficulty as he seemingly isn't a clone, and he does not follow orders as quickly.  His first official posting, a desert planet named Gobi, seems like a punishment as there are problems with it such as poor discipline and contaminated drinking water.  After Harris and a mercenary named Ray Freeman prevent an ex-general from killing all the marines and raiding the armory, Harris is promoted and transferred to the flagship Kamehameha.  The Kamehameha deploys to the planet Ezer Kri, which is attempting to leave the Unified Authority and establish a nonstandard culture (namely, a Japanese one).

After a platoon is killed by locals (they ignite a fuel pumping station), marines are ordered to occupy the largest town on the planet, where Harris runs into Freeman. Freeman sends another soldier back with Harris's helmet on, then leads Harris to the hotel across the street where they ambush Kline, a man they'd dealt with in Gobi, wielding a rifle that has been set to track Harris's helmet signal.

During his interrogation, Kline is revealed to be a Morgan Atkins separatist (an influential terrorist group).  Shortly thereafter, a fleet of separatist ships carrying the deserters from Ezer Kri flees from the planet before anyone can react.

Characters 

 Wayson Harris The protagonist of the book, born the (novel) year 2490, Wayson has better than average tactical skills and responds fast to orders for a human (though not fast enough to avoid some mild reprimands). He originally thinks he's the only human at the orphanage he came from, but it is later revealed he is a newly minted Liberator-class clone. He was created at Unified Authority Orphanage #553. Like all Liberator-class clones, he is engineered to be ambidextrous, but has a preference to be right-handed.

 Vince Lee A clone who has partial realization that he is a clone, or at least enough doubts to make him worry that he will activate the gene that would kill him for that knowledge. He originally transfers Harris to the Kamehameha via shuttle, which is where they become friends. He is an avid bodybuilder and hates other clones. He ends up finding a way to suppress the death reflex by heavily abusing medications, and starts a small band of similarly realized clones.

 Ray Freeman A massive, tall, black, bald freelancer. In a time when race normally doesn't exist anymore, Ray really stands out. A humorless mercenary, Ray sometimes goes to extremes to get the knowledge he wants. His physical strength is roughly the strongest in the series, only potentially being matched by the Seal-class clones, though their fighting style relies less on brute strength and more on speed. He also has in his possession various types of robots and at least two ships, all heavily armored and armed. He wears pitted and scratched up body armor over coveralls, made of stiff bulletproof canvas. Normally has an oversized particle beam pistol, a low yield grenade (described as only having the power to take out a few buildings) and a grenade launcher. He is described by Harris as being intimidating and having intensity radiate from him, and also has intimate knowledge of UA standard equipment.

 Tabor Shannon One of the last Liberator-class clones, Shannon is standoffish on duty, (being described as gruff, ruthless and profane by Harris) but is considerably more relaxed off duty. He is described physically as tall, thin and wiry, with steep shoulders, fine white hair and sunburned. He is presumably killed on Hubble in a type of cave in, trying to flush separatist enemies out. He is very self-sacrificing as an officer, and indeed, his last command was to try to save as many of his unit as possible, at cost of his own life.

 Captain Gaylan McKay Under Klyber, he had been given access to high-profile assignments, color guards, and generally bypassed many other officers despite his rank. He has an informal style of command, treating all as equals. He also is mindful of the equipment the soldiers use; something else uncommon for ranking officers. He explains this as being due to his visor once blacking out in the middle of a fight and him nearly shooting his commanding officer. This was later revealed to be part of a more elaborate way to retrieve the camera footage in Harris's helmet for study; allowing the UA to confirm who had attacked Gobi station.

 Fleet Admiral Bryce Klyber Klyber is the commanding officer of the Kamehameha. He is one of the highest decorated officers in history. He is described by Harris as looking incredibly gaunt and skeletal, the impression is that he could be physically snapped like a twig, but in contrast, his personality and charisma are very pronounced. The only black mark on his record is the Liberator clones he made, which ended up attacking whole worlds. He has an unusual style of command in that, while his fleet is up to date and generally devastating, his own personal command ship is currently the single oldest ship still in service. He has actually upgraded almost everything on the ship itself so that it can easily match anything the newer ships have, but because of its smaller profile and obsolete nature, it is continually underestimated.

 Admiral Robert Thurston A prodigy, Thurston bests Klyber in a simulated battle so effortlessly, that he gets to control the UA fleet and redesigns most of it. Most of the officers give him grudging respect.

 Admiral Che Huang Secretary of the Navy, Che Huang, in a bid to get more power, manages to overthrow Klyber and install his own man (Thurston) aboard the UA's flagship the Kamehameha. Hates Fleet Admiral Bryce Klyber because every Secretary of the Navy has had command of the Kamehameha except for him, also has a deep hating grudge against the Liberator clones because they were Klyber's idea.

 Kasara and Jennifer Two ladies that Harris and Lee met while in Honolulu. The pair had been saving up all year to go. Kasara is easily the more fun loving and reckless of the two, and is the one that suggested Harris to fight the Adam Boyd clone. Jennifer has a fling with Lee, and Kasara has a fling with Harris. Nearer the end of the book, there is a small mention that Kasara got married when she went back home, but it is debatable on if it lasted. They both are in the second book.

Lector, Marshall, Saul three other liberators who also fought in the Galactic Eye and went around killing many people thus getting liberators banned. They also knew Klyber was making more Liberator Clones so they went around killing them, but they could not find Harris until he was on the Kamehameha with Klyber. When they were discovered by Huang they were instantly put back into service under Thurston.

Kline A pathetic fool who takes orders from Crowley which managed to get a grenade glued to his hand by Ray Freeman, which he later cut off because the grenade was timed, on Gobi and a rifle butt to the face when Harris takes the rifle from him before it locked on to his helmet to shoot, on Ezer Kri.

Technology 

 InterLink A type of catch-all media technology. Radio, TV, phone, email/internet all in either civilian headset form, or built into the bubblehead armor. Used frequently to communicate over large distances in civilian application, used as a squad radio in combat. Can be jammed and disabled fairly easily by experienced saboteurs. The civilian version is called mediaLink, and is essentially the same, but with no expectations of security.

 Cloning Most soldiers are clones, bred in vats, and raised in what the government calls orphanages. There are currently only three classes of clones; Liberator class, Seal class, and Bubblehead class. They are demonstrated is being able to have sexual intercourse, but none shown yet able to bear offspring. Part of their Neural Programming is that they would rather be "in the thick of it" than sitting around idle.

 Standard Clones The UA has countless clones, and for the most part, they are treated like expendable equipment. They wear combat armor, and are generally referred to as bubbleheads because of the shape of their helmets. They are all cut from the same helix and are unquestionably loyal, responding to orders before thinking about them. They are designed to think that they are not clones, and a gland in their bodies releases a deadly toxin into their blood, killing them instantly, if they ever accept that they are clones.  This has been called the death reflex.

 SEAL Clones A new type of clone designed by Huang and Thurston. Harris calls them "Adam Boyd" after fighting against one, who had been given that name.  Undersized, thin, and with clawed fingers, they are easily identified by a branding tattoo. The military uses an establishment in Hawaii to give them real fighting experience; each pretends to be 'Adam Boyd' and collectively they have only ever lost one fight, to Harris who killed the clone he fought. They are far faster than the standard clones, meant for guerrilla operations, assassinations, and surgical strikes. They have no death reflex.

 Liberator Clones These clones were originally bred to fight an unknown enemy in the Galactic Central War approximately 40 years before the start of the book.  Liberator clones were designed with a special gland that releases a synthetic hormone during combat that gets them addicted to battle. Following the massacres on several planets by Liberators, this type of clone was outlawed, and all clones since then were bred with the death reflex. The history books refer to them as 'Liberators' because the more accurate 'Butchers' would have been too disrespectful.

 Particle Beam Pistol Extremely accurate pistol. Has roughly the same range as the m27 but has a higher armor penetration value. Can be set to self-destruct. Can be considered useless if there is enough particles and debris in the air. Is preferred in low gravity and thin air, but is unreliable in sandy locations as sand that gets trapped in the housing can scratch up the mirrors. Costs $2000 on the open market. Has internal components that have to be replaced on a regular basis.

 m27 A lightweight, standard issue assault rifle. This is the standard weapon for clones, as it is reliable and easy to maintain. It is depicted as being scoped, with a detachable rifle stock,

 Armored Transport "Kettle" Orbital dropship. Has effective atmospheric shields that burn ozone upon entry causing the cabin to smell bad and heat up. The name 'kettle' is not its specific name, nor the name of any one specific ship; it is the universal nickname given by all marines to the class of ships.

 Kamehameha (ship) The oldest ship to still be used in the UA standing army and the last of the Expansion-Class of fighter carrier. Continually upgraded by its commander, named after the Hawaiian king. Its age by comparison to the rest of the fleet makes it be continually underestimated by foes. This is normally a fatal error as the ship has the best shields possible, and has a weapons load out capable of matching, if not besting, any of the newest ships in the galaxy. Retrofitted to be modern, this is the flagship of roughly every commanding UA officer. Can carry approximately 2300 marines and 15 Armored Transports.

 Doctrinaire (ship) The newest ship, under the command of Klyber, a bat-winged shaped assault vessel. Roughly the biggest ship of the fleet, it was originally meant to be kept a secret. It has multiple launch bays and a fuel supply that takes up two-thirds of the remaining internal space because it has engines that are 5 times the size of those used on Perseus-Class fighter carriers. Self-broadcasting. It is 2 miles wide, twice as wide as a Perseus-Class fighter carrier. It is that large that it needs Dual-Cold fusion reactors to power the onboard electrical systems. It has 13 decks, including the bridge. If one chose to walk from one of the two hangar bays to the bridge, it will take approximately 25 minutes. The Doctrinaire has two forward-facing fixed cannons that are used for bombarding stationary targets, that are both laser and particle beam enabled. The Doctrinaire also has 300 particle beam turrets, 20 missile stations and 15 torpedo stations positioned around its hull. The Doctrinaire has a complement of 280 Tomcat Fighters.

 Perseus-Class Fighter Carrier  New class of fighter carrier which replaced the old Expansion-Class, like the Kamehameha. This class is 45 hundred feet long and 51 hundred feet wide, twice as big compared to the Expansion-Class. Can carry 11000 marines and can carry 3 times more tanks, transports, gunships and fighters than the Expansion-Class.

 Broadcasting A series of mirrors between Earth, Mars, and countless other destinations. In effect, it is essentially a relay transporter. Plans are found of the main facility among the Morgan Atkins separatists intel. Without the broadcasting array, countless worlds would not be able to sustain life for more than a few months. When destroyed later in the series, it causes galaxy wide panic, and many planets simply die off due to unsustainable populations having insufficient resources. Ships that Self-Broadcast capable need to be at least 1'000 miles from any Broadcast Discs to prevent causing any damage to the Discs. It is believed that Mogat (GEF - Galactic Eye Fleet) have been modified in some way not to have this effect.

Reception 

Harold Goldberg writes that the book features "taut writing and a truly imaginative plot full of introspection and philosophizing."

Clinton Lawrence of SciFi Weekly states, "The Clone Republic doesn't break any new ground, and sometimes it seems a bit derivative of earlier science fiction, but it has no serious flaws. Kent is a skillful storyteller, and the book entertains throughout."

References 

2006 novels
2006 science fiction novels
Berkley Books books
Novels set in the 26th century